The William C. Rose Award given by the American Society for Biochemistry and Molecular Biology recognizes outstanding contributions to biochemical and molecular biological research and a demonstrated commitment to the training of younger scientists, as epitomized by the late American nutritionist William Cumming Rose. The nominations are filed by the Society members, but the nominees need not be ASBMB members.

Past recipients 
Source: American Society for Biochemistry and Molecular Biology

1979 – Minor J. Coon
1980 – Bert L. Vallee
1981 – M. Daniel Lane
1982 – Hector F. DeLuca
1983 – Robert T. Schimke
1984 – Alton Meister
1985 – Esmond E. Snell
1986 – Irwin C. Gunsalus
1987 – Theresa Stadtman
1988 – Henry A. Lardy
1989 – Paul D. Boyer
1990 – Harland G. Wood
1991 – Robert L. Hill
1992 – Eugene P. Kennedy
1993 – Irving M. Klotz
1994 – Robert H. Abeles
1995 – Celia White Tabor, Herbert Tabor
1996 – Julius Adler
1997 – Charles Yanofsky
1998 – Robert D. Simoni
1999 – Richard W. Hanson
2000 – Rowena Green Matthews
2001 – Marc W. Kirschner
2002 – Gordon Hammes
2003 – Jack E. Dixon
2004 – Sunney I. Chan
2005 – Frederick Guengerich
2006 – William L. Smith
2007 – Susan S. Taylor
2008 – John D. Scott
2009 – Sandra Schmid
2010 – Daniel Herschlag
2011 – Melissa J. Moore
2012 – Susan Marqusee
2013 – Ivan Đikić
2014 – Lynne Maquat
2015 – Kathleen Matthews
2016 – Susan J. Baserga
2017 – William T. Wickner
2018 – Steven G. Clarke
2019 – Dorothy Shippen
2020 – Celia Schiffer
2021 – J. Martin Bollinger

See also

 List of biology awards

References

External links

Biology awards
American science and technology awards
Awards established in 1979